The Ministry of Justice is the justice ministry of the government of Egypt. Its headquarters are in Cairo.

Profile
On 17 June 2014 Mahfouz Saber was appointed minister of justice.

On 20 May 2015 Ahmed El-Zend was appointed as minister of justice and 
was reappointed on 19 September 2015, but on 14 March 2016, he was removed from his post by Egyptian Prime Minister, Sherif Ismail, for making controversial comments.

On 23 March Mohamed Hossam Abdel Rahim was named minister of justice.

List of ministers
 Mohammed Sabri Abu Alam (1942-1944)
 Mohamed Ali Rushdie (1952)
 Ahmed Hosni (1952-1961)
 Nihad Al-Qasim (1961)
 Fathi Al-Sharqawi (1961-1964)
 Badawi Ibrahim Hamouda (1964-1965)
 Essam El Din Hassouna (1965-1968)
 Mohamed Abu Nusair (1968-1969)
 Mustafa Kamel Ismail (1969-1970)
 Hassan Fahmi al-Badawi (1970-1971)
 Mohamed Mohamed Salama (1971-1973)
 Fakhri Mohamed Abdel Nabi (1973-1974)
 Mustafa Fahmi Abu Zeid (1974–1975)
 Adel Younis (1975-1976)
 Ahmed Talaat (1976-1978)
 Ahmed Mamdouh Attia (1978)
 Ahmed Ali Moussa (1978-1979)
 Anwar Abdel Fattah Abu Sahli (1979-1981)
 Ahmed Sameer Sami (1981-1982)
 Ahmed Mamdouh Attia (1982-1987)
 Farouk Seif Al Nasr (1987-2004)
 Mahmoud Abul Leil (2004-2006)
 Mamdouh Marei (2006-2011)
 Mohamed Abdel Aziz Al Jundi  (2011)
 Adel Abdul Hamid (2011-2012)
 Ahmed Mekki (2012-2013)
 Ahmed Suleiman (2013)
 Adel Abdel Hamid (2013-2014)
 Nair Othman (2014)
 Mahfouz Saber (2014-2015) 
 Ahmed Al Zind (2015-2016)
 Mohamed Hossam (2016–2018 or 19)
 Omar Marawan (2018 or 2019 to present)

See also

Cabinet of Egypt
Justice ministry
Politics of Egypt

References

External links
 Ministry of Justice official website
Egypt's Cabinet Database

Year of establishment missing
Justice
Egypt